This is a round-up of the 1987 Mayo Senior Football Championship. Ballina Stephenites regained the Moclair Cup after defeating old rivals and holders Castlebar Mitchels in the final.

Preliminary round

First round

Quarter finals

Semi-finals

Mayo Senior Football Championship Final

References

 Connaught Telegraph, Autumn 1987
 Western People, Summer/Autumn 1987

External links

Mayo Senior Football Championship
1987